Adakanahalli  is a village in the southern state of Karnataka, India. It is located in the Nanjangud taluk of Mysore district.

2016 Scout camp
In 2016, Adakanahalli received 30,000 visitors who came to attend a national Scouts and Guides camp.

See also
 Mysore
 Districts of Karnataka

References

External links

Villages in Mysore district